is a former Japanese football player.

Playing career
Momitani was born in Osaka Prefecture on June 2, 1981. He joined J1 League club Cerezo Osaka from youth team in 2000. However he could not play at all in the match until 2001. In 2002, he moved to Prefectural Leagues club Thespa Kusatsu. He played many matches as center back and the club was promoted to Regional Leagues from 2003, Japan Football League (JFL) from 2004 and J2 League from 2005. Although he played many matches until 2005, he could not play many matches in 2006. In 2007, he moved to Regional Leagues club AC Nagano Parceiro. He played as regular player and the club was promoted to JFL from 2011. However his opportunity to play decreased from 2011 and he retired end of 2012 season.

Club statistics

References

External links

1981 births
Living people
Association football people from Osaka Prefecture
Japanese footballers
J1 League players
J2 League players
Japan Football League players
Cerezo Osaka players
Thespakusatsu Gunma players
AC Nagano Parceiro players
Association football defenders